Kirkby Lonsdale is a civil parish in the South Lakeland District of Cumbria, England. It contains 163 listed buildings that are recorded in the National Heritage List for England. Of these, two are listed at Grade I, the highest of the three grades, four are at Grade II*, the middle grade, and the others are at Grade II, the lowest grade.  The parish contains the town of Kirkby Lonsdale and the surrounding countryside.  A high proportion of the listed buildings are near the centre of the town, and are mainly houses and associated structures, shops, business premises, public houses, and churches and associated structures.  The other listed buildings include farmhouses and farm buildings, bridges, two market crosses, and milestones.


Key

Buildings

Notes and references

Notes

Citations

Sources

Lists of listed buildings in Cumbria
Listed buildings in